Melvin Mamaclay (born June 1, 1979) is a Filipino retired professional basketball player who last played for the Sta. Lucia Realtors in the Philippine Basketball Association. He was drafted thirteenth overall by Sta. Lucia  in 2007.

Professional career
Mamaclay was acquired by the Sta. Lucia Realtors in the 2007 PBA Draft when they traded Mark Isip and Ricky Calimag to the Coca-Cola Tigers.

External links
Player Profile
PBA-Online Profile

1979 births
Filipino men's basketball players
Living people
People from Vigan
Basketball players from Ilocos Sur
Ilocano people
Adamson Soaring Falcons basketball players
Small forwards
Power forwards (basketball)
Sta. Lucia Realtors players
Sta. Lucia Realtors draft picks